Fortunato Misiano (October 11, 1899 – February 11, 1976) was an Italian film producer. In 1946 he founded the Rome-based Romana Film which continued producing films until 1969. The company specialised in turning out films in popular genres during the post-war boom years of Italian cinema.

Selected filmography
 Mist on the Sea (1944)
 Lost in the Dark (1947)
 Baron Carlo Mazza (1948)
 What Price Innocence? (1952)
 The Island Monster (1954)
 Letter from Naples (1954)
 Tears of Love (1954)
 It Takes Two to Sin in Love (1954)
 Mermaid of Naples (1956)
 The Knight of the Black Sword (1956)
 Pirates of the Coast (1960)
 Knight of 100 Faces (1960)
 Sword in the Shadows (1961)
 Queen of the Seas (1961)
 Catherine of Russia (1963)
 The Invincible Masked Rider (1963)
 Assault on the State Treasure (1967)
 Zorro in the Court of England (1968)
 The Son of Black Eagle (1968)

References

Bibliography 
 Marlow-Mann, Alex. The New Neapolitan Cinema. Edinburgh University Press, 2011.

External links 
 

1899 births
1976 deaths
Italian film producers
People from Messina
Film people from the Province of Messina